Caliente is a Moroccan dish common in the north of the country. The savory pie consists of a mixture of chickpea flour, oil, eggs, spices, pepper, and cheese. It is typically sold by the slice by food vendors on carts in lower-income districts.

The dish's origin is debated, although most people attribute the dish to the Moroccan Sephardic Jewish community that resided in Tangier's old medina and sold the dish at the local souk. "Caliente" is the Spanish word for "hot".

References 

Moroccan cuisine